Phragmipedium tetzlaffianum is a species of orchid endemic to Venezuela.

References

External links 

tetzlaffianum
Endemic orchids of Venezuela